Decoder may refer to:

Technology
 Audio decoder converts digital audio to analog form
 Binary decoder, digital circuits such as 1-of-N and seven-segment decoders
 Decompress (compression decoder), converts compressed data (e.g., audio/video/images) to an uncompressed form
 Instruction decoder, an electronic circuit that converts computer instructions into CPU control signals
 Quadrature decoder, converts signals from an incremental encoder into counter control signals
 Video decoder, converts base-band analog video to digital form

Music
 Decoder (band), a defunct post-hardcore band that was briefly named Lead Hands
 Decoder (duo), a drum and bass duo
 Decoder (album)

Other uses
 Decoder (film), a 1984 West German film

See also
 Decoding methods
 Code (disambiguation)
 Recode (disambiguation)